Surimurthypuram (Akkaravattam) is a village in the Orathanadu taluk of Thanjavur district, Tamil Nadu, India.

Demographics 

As per the 2001 census, Surimurthypuram (Akkaravattam) had a total population of 414 with 202 males and 212 females. The sex ratio was 1050. The literacy rate was 61.97.

References 

 

Villages in Thanjavur district